Major Nelson may refer to:
Alfred Nelson-Williams, Major-General in the Republic of Sierra Leone
Major Nelson, a character from I Dream of Jeannie played by Larry Hangman in Reallife
Larry Hryb, nicknamed Major Nelson, director of Programming for Xbox Live